Chapman Snowfield is a large snowfield lying west of the central ridge in the Churchill Mountains, bounded to the north by Elder Peak and the massif surmounted by Mount Wharton, to the south by Soza Icefalls, Black Icefalls and the head of Starshot Glacier, and to the west by the Wallabies Nunataks and the All-Blacks Nunataks. It was named after William H. Chapman, topographic engineer, United States Geological Survey, leader of the 1961–62 Topo North – Topo South survey of mountains west of the Ross Sea from Cape Roget, Adare Peninsula, to Otway Massif at the head of Beardmore Glacier, a traverse totalling . This first helicopter-supported traverse with electronic-distant-measuring instruments resulted in the establishment of ground control making possible the mapping of a  area of the Transantarctic Mountains.

References
 

Snow fields of Oates Land